Daan Samson (born 1973) is a Dutch artist. His work deals with taboos, embarrassments and achievements of the welfare state.

Samson lives and works in Rotterdam. Together with Dutch artists Tinkebell and Jonas Staal he is regarded as an exponent of a new category media artists.
By taking up distinct positions in the media, social issues are being broached. In Samson’s case, the artist distributes works that call for the rejection of the concept of sinfulness. According to some critics he takes a cynical stance, bearing resemblance to a right‑wing liberal argument.
Samson calls himself a ‘prosperity artist’ and argues for a re-evaluation of material objects. Within this context, he repeatedly refers to the duality of the vanitas theme in classic painting. Our lives would only be a temporary thing, and also full of spiritual and physical hardship. Basing himself on the Calvinist motto of ‘memento mori’ he propagates the idea that well-made products can help alleviate our earthly lives. In Samson’s view, even intellectuals should not hesitate to enjoy worldly pleasures.
This approach is expressed in performances, installations and photographs. He often seeks the collaboration of producers of luxury items and by making these sponsorships part of his art works he is challenging the boundaries of his artistic autonomy. Sponsors with whom Samson has realised art works include Bugaboo International, Smeg, Ketel One Vodka and Magimix.

Personal life 

Samson grew up in a family with leftist inclinations. Especially his father, who was from a working-class background and became a high-level civil servant, apparently always maintained an attitude of solidarity with people from the lower social classes. This solidarity expressed itself in the family’s modest lifestyle. His father supposedly was quite disappointed when, starting in 2001, the electorate started to favour the populist politician Pim Fortuyn, a man who, according to the artist, had no qualms about displaying his personal good fortune to the outside world. It was this experience that supposedly inspired Samson to embrace a more liberal and materialistic attitude in life.

The Liberal Herbarium with Halbe Zijlstra 

Just before the Dutch general elections of 2012, Samson created an art work together with the neoliberal politician Halbe Zijlstra (VVD), who was State Secretary of Education, Culture and Science at the time. They made a herbarium. Using the world of wild flora as a metaphor, the two men advocated an art climate in which artists would not make themselves dependent upon resources that could be influenced by politics. A photographic documentation of this collaboration was published one day before the elections in the national newspaper NRC Handelsblad. Leading art magazine Metropolis M described the work as ‘a slightly nauseating image’.

Procession of value and harvest 

In February 2012, Samson was asked to perform the opening ceremony of the art centre NP3.tmp in Groningen. He did so by organising a procession through the city. In a Procession of value and harvest volunteers carried a selection of sponsored luxury items through the town centre. All of these articles, ranging from fitness machines to outdoor kitchens, were sacrifices from the business world. When the procession was over, all the items became personal possessions of the artist.

Art Babes 

In 2011, the art series Art Babes was launched during the international art fair Art Rotterdam. This was a collaboration with photographer Jeronimus van Pelt, showing photographs of female art professionals posing as sex objects. The women included art theorists, artists, curators and a museum director. The idea was to investigate whether society would allow female intellectuals to present themselves as having a sexual identity. The project stirred a lot of debate and received much media interest. The editor of Kunstbeeld magazine chose Art Babes as ‘the least appreciable art work of the international art fair’.

Tabloid with Frits Bolkestein 

In 2011, Samson produced a tabloid in collaboration with Frits Bolkestein, a retired prominent liberal politician.  The paper presented the documentation of a ‘pamper day’ to which Bolkestein was treated by the artist in Rotterdam’s museum district. The tabloid was published recently after Frits Bolkestein – at a demonstration against budget cuts for culture – had pleaded for more government spending on art and culture; albeit by cutting back on development aid.
In 2011, the Wiarda Beckman Foundation – the scientific bureau of the Dutch labour party – invited Samson to publish works of art in their monthly magazine Socialism & Democracy. In the end, the editors of the magazine refused to publish his selection. In their view, the images of Art Babes and Frits Bolkestein were too right-wing. The rejection made the national news.

Showing one's colours 

In 2008, Samson asked hundreds of schoolboys and schoolgirls to compose letters in which he would cancel his membership of the PVDA (the Dutch labour party). The pupils were asked to give a motivation why the artist no longer wished to be a party member. All these letters, signed by Samson, were sent to the party headquarters. This educational project, entitled "Showing one's colours", was part of the educational programme of exhibition space TENT in Rotterdam.

External links 

Official website

References 

Living people
1973 births
Dutch artists
Artists from Rotterdam